"Hey Girl Don't Bother Me" is a popular single by American vocal group The Tams. Written by Ray Whitley, it was originally released in 1964 and reached number 41 on the Billboard Hot 100 and number 10 on the R&B chart.

It later became a favourite on the Northern soul scene in the UK, belatedly reaching number one on the UK Singles Chart for three weeks in September 1971.
The single was also number one on the Irish Singles Chart, for one week, the same month. The group appeared on BBC's Top of the Pops with the song on eight separate occasions in 1971: August 19 and 26, September 7, 16, 23 and 30, October 7 and December 27.

Charts

See also
List of number-one singles of 1971 (Ireland)
List of number-one singles from the 1970s (UK)

References

 

1964 singles
UK Singles Chart number-one singles
Irish Singles Chart number-one singles
ABC Records singles
1964 songs
Northern soul songs
Songs written by Ray Whitley (songwriter)